Sigwart is a German surname. Notable people with the surname include:

 Christoph von Sigwart, German philosopher and logician
 George Karl Ludwig Sigwart, German chemist and physician
 Jendrik Sigwart (born 1994), German singer known by the mononym Jendrik. He represented Germany in Eurovision Song Contest 2021
 Ulrich Sigwart, cardiologist (for whom is named the Sigwart procedure)

German-language surnames